Saša Marković may refer to:

 Saša Marković (basketball), basketball player for Panathinaikos B.C.
 Saša Marković (footballer, born 1971), Serbian football manager and former player
 Saša Marković (footballer, born 1991), football player born in 1991
 Saša Marković Mikrob, Serbian artist, journalist, radio host, social worker and performer